The Bronze Sphinx of Thutmose III is a statuette of a sphinx made during the 18th Dynasty of Egypt under the reign of Thutmose III, who ruled from c. 1479 to 1425 BCE. Adorned with multiple symbols of royal power, it might have been an element or a lock. It was purchased by the Louvre in 1826, and is part of the permanent collections in the display case 4 in Room 637 (formerly 24), Sully Wing, first floor.

Symbolism 
The statuette is adorned with gold inlays highlighting symbols of royal power. The sphinx depicts Pharaoh reclining on the Nine bows, which represent the traditional enemies of Egypt brought to submission. The front of the statuette uses the lapwing Rekhyt bird to spell: "all the people give praise", using the basket hieroglyph V30 𓎠 ("nb") for "all"; the lapwing hieroglyph G24 𓅛 ("rḫyt") for "the people"; and the star hieroglyph N14 𓇼 for "praising" (this is a rebus). Djed pillars of "Dominion" adorn on the side of the statuette.

Sources and references 
 Sphinx de Thoutmosis III, www.louvre.fr

Eighteenth Dynasty of Egypt
Sculptures of ancient Egypt
Egyptian antiquities of the Louvre